BSV Kickers Emden is a German association football club, located in Emden, Lower Saxony.

History

The club first began playing in 1928 as a section of the gymnastics club Emder Turnverein, which was founded in 1861. An independent football club was formed on 24 March 1946 out of the membership of this predecessor side and several other local associations which had been dissolved after World War II.

In 1949, the club was promoted to the Amateuroberliga Niedersachsen-West, a second-division league at the time. They went on to finish first in the league at the end of the 1950–51 season and advanced therewith to the promotion play-offs for at the time first-division Oberliga Nord, but did not manage to get promoted. They were only a mediocre team in the Amateuroberliga Niedersachsen-West in the remainder of the decade and eventually slipped down to the fourth-division Verbandsliga Niedersachen-Nord in 1964. They returned to the third-division Amateurliga Niedersachsen in 1970, but were relegated back to the fourth division after three seasons.

Between 1975 and 1983, the club competed below fourth division. They managed to return to the fourth division for the 1983–84 season, but were relegated back to the fifth division after three seasons. Another return to the fourth division followed in 1988 and the club was eventually promoted to the third-division Amateuroberliga Nord after finishing first in the 1990–91 season of the fourth-division Verbandsliga Niedersachsen.

They participated in the DFB-Pokal for the first time in the 1992–93 season, but were eliminated in the first round by then Bundesliga side 1. FC Saarbrücken, who easily beat them 5–1. The club also won berths in the German Cup after winning the Cup of Lower Saxony in 1996 and 2000. However, both of these two appearances in the German Cup ended in the first round as well. In the 1996–97 season, they lost 3–1 to then Bundesliga side Fortuna Düsseldorf and in the 2000–01 season they suffered a minimal 1–0 defeat to 1. FSV Mainz 05, a 2. Bundesliga side at the time.

A first-place finish in the third-division Amateuroberliga Nord in the 1993–94 season, after which the club failed to ascend to the 2. Bundesliga in a post-season tournament, would have to be considered the recent high point. The club continued to compete in then newly founded third-division Regionalliga Nord and never finished below 9th place in the following four seasons, but a 15th-place finish in the 1998–99 season of the league dropped them back to the fourth division after eight seasons in the third division. The club subsequently competed in the fourth-division Oberliga Niedersachsen/Bremen for five seasons and narrowly missed return to the Regionalliga Nord in 2000 and 2003, when they advanced to the promotion play-offs in which they lost to Lüneburger SK and VfR Neumünster respectively. In the 2004–05 season, the club finished first in then newly founded fourth-division Oberliga Nord and returned to the third-division Regionalliga Nord for the 2005–06 season. In their first season since returning to the third division, Kickers Emden managed a ninth-place finish in the Regionalliga Nord. After a successful 2008–09 season in the 3. Liga, finishing sixth, the club decided to withdraw from the league for financial reasons. Instead of the tier-four Regionalliga Nord, the club decided to enter the tier-five Oberliga Niedersachsen-West for 2009–10, also for financial reasons. In 2012, Kickers were sent down to Landesliga after insolvency, annulling games they played in Oberliga and downgrading their remaining fixtures into friendlies.

Other departments
Kickers Emden has other departments for table tennis and gorodki.

Notable coaches 
 Jürgen Bogs, former trainer of BFC Dynamo. One of the most successful trainer in DDR with a total of 10 major titles in a row (1979–1988).
 Stefan Emmerling, former player in the Bundesliga
 Marc Fascher, led Kickers Emden into the third division (Regionalliga)
 Michael Krüger
 Thomas Richter
 Gerd Roggensack

Recent seasons
Recent seasons of the club:

Honours
The club's honours:
 Oberliga Nord
 Champions: 1994, 2005
 Oberliga Niedersachsen/Bremen
 Champions: 2000, 2003
 Verbandsliga Niedersachsen
 Champions: 1989, 1991

Staff 
Head Coach
 Stefan Emmerling

Assistant Coaches
 Sascha Richarz (Assistant coach)
Yasin Turan (Assistant coach)
Gerwin Schmidt (Goalkeeper coach)

Management
Carsten Herzog (Sporting management)
Arno Janssen (Teammanager)

Physiotherapist
 Hendrik Peters

References

External links
 Official website
 The Abseits Guide to German Soccer

 
Football clubs in Germany
Football clubs in Lower Saxony
Association football clubs established in 1946
1946 establishments in Germany
Emden
3. Liga clubs